Sean Thomas Clancy (born 16 September 1987) is an English footballer who plays as either a left back or left midfielder. He is the brother of model Abbey Clancy, who is married to fellow footballer Peter Crouch.

Career

Blackpool
Born in Liverpool, Merseyside, he made his professional debut for Blackpool whilst still in secondary school at the age of 16. After playing two first team League 1 matches for Blackpool he left the club in 2006.

Southport
Following his departure from Blackpool, Clancy joined non-league outfit Southport in 2006 where he lasted just one season and played 11 league matches for the club.

Altrincham
Clancy briefly joined Altrincham in 2007 but only played 4 league matches before signing for Burscough.

Burscough
Clancy played for Burscough from 2007 to 2009 and enjoyed his most regular spell of first team matches having played 57 league matches and scoring one goal.

Fleetwood Town
In 2009, he signed for Fleetwood Town. He was included in the Conference North team of the season after scoring 18 goals from midfield in season 2009–10 while helping Fleetwood to win promotion to the Conference National via winning the play-off final at Fleetwood's own Highbury Stadium. After promotion Clancy was a regular for the club helping them achieve a play-off spot in their first season in the new league and achieving promotion to League Two. On 16 March 2012, Fleetwood Town announced that Clancy had joined Conference North side F.C. Halifax Town on loan until the end of the season. He was released by the club in May 2012.

Chester
In June 2012 he joined Chester, despite having offers from clubs at Conference Premier level.

Kidderminster Harriers
On 20 December 2012, Kidderminster Harriers signed Clancy on a non-contract deal following his exit from Conference North leaders Chester. He was released on 5 February 2013 after spending 6 weeks at the club.

Southport
Following his release from Kidderminster Harriers Clancy rejoined Southport on 23 February for the remainder of the season with a view to add a contract extension.

AFC Telford United
On 3 May 2013 it was announced that Clancy would join AFC Telford United, on the same day as his former Southport boss Watson joined the club. On 26 April 2014 he won promotion to the Conference Premier with Telford after they clinched the Conference North title in the final game of the season. He was released in May 2016.

International career
Clancy has been included in two international squad lists. He missed the first due to personal circumstances but was called up a second time, making his debut for England C in the Challenge Trophy Final match against Portugal on 19 May 2011.

References
General

Burscough FC profile

Specific

1987 births
Living people
Footballers from Liverpool
English footballers
England semi-pro international footballers
Blackpool F.C. players
Chester F.C. players
Southport F.C. players
Altrincham F.C. players
Burscough F.C. players
Fleetwood Town F.C. players
English Football League players
National League (English football) players
FC Halifax Town players
AFC Telford United players
Kidderminster Harriers F.C. players
Association football fullbacks
Association football midfielders